Gregg Harold Schumacher (born June 30, 1942) is a former American football defensive end in the National Football League. After playing college football for Illinois, Schumacher was drafted by the San Francisco 49ers in the 13th round (170th overall) of the 1965 NFL Draft. He played two seasons for the Los Angeles Rams (1967–1968).

References

1942 births
Living people
Players of American football from Chicago
American football defensive ends
Illinois Fighting Illini football players
Los Angeles Rams players